In Return is the second album by American electronic music duo Odesza, released on September 9, 2014 through Counter and Ninja Tune. It is the major label debut of the electronic duo after the release of their self-released debut album Summer's Gone two years prior and follows up that album.

The album debuted atop the Top Dance/Electronic Albums chart and was positively received by critics.

The "Say My Name" track (instrumental version) used in Windows 10 Promotional and Retail Demo Video.

Background and composition
During production, Mills and Knight were more open to experimentation, favoring more of a singer-songwriter approach with a greater focus on lyrical content. The result is a more vocally driven album, contrasting with their previous sample-based releases. Coming from a classically trained background, Knight was more concerned of the technicality of the music, while Mills focused on the production side. Knight's interest in pop and dance music influenced Mill's tastes, which contributed to the direction of the album. The track "It's Only" was distinguished by the duo as "the most mature growth [on the album]" due to its more unconventional production.

The album's name is a reference to the duo's appreciation of returning home after a long period of touring.

In Return was released a few weeks earlier than intended due to fan anticipation. On September 18, 2015, the deluxe edition of the album was released containing live and instrumental tracks from the standard edition album, in addition to the single "Light" featuring Little Dragon.

Critical reception
In Return received positive reviews from critics. David Jeffries from AllMusic gave the album a rating of 4 out of 5, calling the album a "humble crowd-pleaser" while praising its variety. Renowned for Sound's Angus Fitz-Bugden gave a rating of 4/5, complimenting the album's ambience and production.

Accolades
In Return was nominated for Top Dance/Electronic Album at the 2016 Billboard Music Awards. The RAC remix of "Say My Name" was also nominated for Best Remixed Recording, Non-Classical at the 58th Annual Grammy Awards.

Commercial performance
In Return debuted at number 1 on the Top Dance/Electronic Albums chart, selling 6,000 album-equivalent units in the first week. The album also debuted and peaked at number 42 on the Billboard 200.

Track listing

Charts

Weekly charts

Year-end charts

Decade-end charts

References

2014 albums
Odesza albums